Muhammad Akram Sheikh is a Pakistani attorney in the Supreme Court of Pakistan. He remained member Pakistan Bar Council  and President Supreme Court Bar Association of Pakistan. His two son  are Advocate and member of Lahore High Court Bar Association. He also enjoyed the  office of Ambassador  -at-Large   of Pakistan  dully appointed by Prime Minister  Nawaz Sharif. He was closely associated with Barrister Ijaz Husain Batalvi  and his elder son Raheel Kamran Sheikh member Pakistan Bar Council also joined Ijaz Husain Batalvi  Chamber where Akhtar Aly Kureshy  Advocate was there to welcome him. He was appointed Public Prosecutor in General Pervez Musharraf  High Treason case, a noval case in the history of Pakistan to uphold the supremacy of Constitution  in which General Pervez Musharraf  was sentenced to death, a new milestone.

Early life and career
Muhammad Akram Sheikh was born near Burewala, Vehari District in Punjab, Pakistan. He received his education from Forman Christian College, Lahore. Then he finished his postgraduate studies at the University of Punjab, Lahore in 1972.
He started his career from the District Bar Association, Sahiwal in 1973. 
He also became a lawyer of the Lahore High Court.
 He then served as Chairman  Executive Committee (CEC) of Pakistan Bar Council (1993-1994). 
He also had served as President of Supreme Court Bar Association of Pakistan some years ago.

Major court cases
Akram Sheikh has contested many major court cases including:
 In a much-publicized case in the recent past, Akram Sheikh represented a Pakistani-American Mansoor Ijaz who had alleged that the then Pakistani ambassador in the US Hussain Haqqani had written a memo to US authorities asking for American help against the intervention in politics by the Pakistani military. This memo had allegedly been written by Haqqani on the advice of then Pakistani President Asif Ali Zardari.
Akram Sheikh has represented Nawaz Sharif and his family in many criminal and constitutional cases against them since the early 1990s. 
 In 1988–89, Akram Sheikh successfully defended Punjab government's right to open up its own bank Bank of Punjab. At that time, there was a confrontation between Nawaz Sharif's Punjab government and the federal government of Benazir Bhutto.

Notable news media appearances
 Akram Sheikh has been vocal on national and international forums for human rights, independence of judiciary and rule of law. For example, he participated in the 'Lawyers March for Law in Pakistan' on 14 November 2007 (news coverage of this march by US TV channel C-Span Network is shown on their website).

References

External links

Pakistani lawyers
Living people
People from Burewala
University of the Punjab alumni
Forman Christian College alumni
Year of birth missing (living people)
Presidents of the Supreme Court Bar Association of Pakistan
Chairmen of the Pakistan Bar Council
People from Lahore